The 2006 Tour of the Basque Country was the 46th Tour of the Basque Country road cycling race and was held over six stages from 3 April to 8 April 2006. It was won by Spaniard José Ángel Gómez Marchante of the  cycling team.

Stages

Stage 1
3 April 2006 – Irun to Irun,

Stage 2
4 April 2006 – Irun to Segura,

Stage 3
5 April 2006 – Segura to Lerín,

Stage 4
6 April 2005 – Lerín to Vitoria-Gasteiz,

Stage 5
7 April 2006 – Vitoria-Gasteiz to Zalla,

Stage 6
8 April 2006 – Zalla to Zalla,  (ITT)

This stage was an individual time trial.

Classification tables

References

2006
Tour of the Basque Country
Bas